John Westwood Rowley Smith (28 July 1924 – 12 December 1991) was an English cricketer. Smith was a right-handed batsman who fielded as a wicket-keeper. He was born at Clarendon Park, Leicestershire.

Smith made his first-class debut for Leicestershire against the touring West Indians in 1950. He made two further first-class appearances for Leicestershire, against Nottinghamshire in the 1950 County Championship, and Oxford University in 1955. He scored 5 runs in his three first-class appearances, while behind the stumps he took a single catch and made a single stumping.

He died at Bruntingthorpe, Leicestershire on 12 December 1991.

References

External links
John Smith at ESPNcricinfo
John Smith at CricketArchive

1924 births
1991 deaths
Cricketers from Leicester
English cricketers
Leicestershire cricketers
Wicket-keepers